The 1970–71 Washington Huskies men's basketball team represented the University of Washington for the 1970–71 NCAA college basketball season. Led by third-year head coach Tex Winter, the Huskies were members of the Pacific-8 Conference and played their home games on campus at Hec Edmundson Pavilion in Seattle, Washington.

After the season in May 1971, Winter left to become head coach of the NBA's San Diego Rockets, who moved to Houston that  Marv Harshman was hired in June, and he led the Huskies for fourteen seasons. He was previously the head coach at rival Washington State for thirteen years, preceded by thirteen years at his alma mater, Pacific Lutheran.

References

External links
Sports Reference – Washington Huskies: 1970–71 basketball season

Washington Huskies men's basketball seasons
Washington Huskies
Washington
Washington